The Holtzman inkblot technique (HIT), also known as the Holtzman inkblot test, is an ink blot test aimed at detecting personality and was conceived by Wayne H. Holtzman and colleagues. It was first introduced in 1961 as a projective personality test similar to the Rorschach. The HIT is a standardized measurement. The Holtzman Inkblot Test was developed as an attempt to address some controversial issues surrounding the Rorschach Inkblot Test.

Purpose

The Holtzman inkblot test (HIT) was invented as an attempt to address some issues surrounding the Rorschach Inkblot Test. The HIT was used to assess the personal structure of the subject.

Scoring
The scoring includes 22 variables covering the aspects of the patient's response to the inkblot. Many different variables apply when scoring.

22 variables and abbreviations applied

Test standardization
Holtzman and Swartz (1983), reviewing 25 years of research, reported that, in the standardization of the HIT, 22 quantitative variables had been developed, covering most of the scoring categories and dimensions used with the Rorschach Test. High reliability coefficients had been reported in a large number of investigations. Norms for several important clinical reference groups had been established (for example schizophrenics, depressives, delinquents, neurotics, and alcoholics). The six factors, representing the most important variables, had proven useful in clinical applications of the HIT. A large number of studies had confirmed the technique's differential validity, supported by findings from longitudinal, cross-sectional, and cross-cultural investigations. Several hundred studies had been published on the relationships between HIT variables and other measures of personality. Still other investigations of external validity had been conducted using physiological and behavioral measures, as well as personality questionnaires. The authors also summarized the results from studies using the German version of the HIT and discussed recent advances with the test.

U.S. and Mexico
The test correlation between U.S. and Mexican populations has been estimated to range from .36 for Popular to .81 for normal adults. The most stable of the inkblot scores was location in the United States and Mexico. Reaction, Time, Form Definiteness, Movement, and Human also scored relatively high in both cultures. However, these aspects test more of the cognitive-perceptual aspects rather than personality characteristics. Rejection, Form Appropriateness, Shading, Pathognomic Verbalization, Barrier, and Penetration had lower stability coefficients while Space, Sex, Abstract and Balance proved to be extremely infrequent in the children's samples. Test results generally became more stable with age. The children showed a much weaker stability of data than that of older patients and adults possessed the greatest stability of information.

See also

References

Projective tests